Henry Venn is the name of:
 Henry Venn (Clapham Sect) (1725–1797), English evangelical minister
 Henry Venn (Church Missionary Society) (1796–1873), pioneer in indigenous missions theory